Cui Rong (653–706) was a Chinese poet and politician during the Tang dynasty, which includes the short-lived dynasty of Wu Zetian. His poetry style was typical of Tang poetry. He is famous for editing an anthology of poetry of the court of Wu Zetian: a work known as the Collection of Precious Glories (Zhuying ji), which contained poems by himself, Li Jiao (644–713), Zhang Yue (677–731), and others. The original work was long thought to be completely lost, however fragments constituting about one-fifth of the original were found among the manuscripts found at Dunhuang, with fifty-five poems by thirteen men. One notable feature of this anthology is that Cui Rong arranged the work in descending order of official rank of the included poets; which, among other things, highlights the nature of early Tang poetry as a type of court poetry.

See also
Classical Chinese poetry
Li Jiao
Princess Taiping
Wang Fangqing
Xue Yuanchao
Zhuying ji

Notes

References
Yu, Pauline (2002). "Chinese Poetry and Its Institutions", in Hsiang Lectures on Chinese Poetry, Volume 2, Grace S. Fong, editor. Montreal: Center for East Asian Research, McGill University.

653 births
706 deaths
7th-century Chinese poets
8th-century Chinese poets
Chinese poetry anthologists
Poets from Shandong
Politicians from Jinan
Tang dynasty poets
Tang dynasty politicians from Shandong
Writers from Jinan